Eduardo Albe (born 21 January 1900–9 November 1975) was an Argentine sprinter. He competed in the men's 100 metres at the 1928 Summer Olympics.

References

External links
 

1900 births
1975 deaths
Athletes (track and field) at the 1928 Summer Olympics
Argentine male sprinters
Olympic athletes of Argentina
20th-century Argentine people